Shen Jingsi (born 3 May 1989 in Zhangzhou, Fujian) is a Chinese volleyball player. She was part of the gold medal winning team at the 2010 Asian Games.

Career
Shen was the setter of China women's national volleyball team, and she joined the team go to the 2010 FIVB Women's World Championship which was held in Japan. She played in the Army club and was the captain of the team.

Shen played at the 2013 Club World Championship with Guangdong Evergrande, and she was selected Best Setter. Her team claimed the bronze medal, winning 3-1 against Voléro Zürich.

Clubs
  Army (2007-)
  Guangdong Evergrande (2013)

Awards

Individuals
 2013 FIVB Women's Club World Championship "Best Setter"

Clubs
 2013 Club World Championship -  Bronze medal, with Guangdong Evergrande

References

1989 births
Living people
Chinese women's volleyball players
Asian Games medalists in volleyball
Volleyball players at the 2010 Asian Games
Asian Games gold medalists for China
Medalists at the 2010 Asian Games
Setters (volleyball)
Sportspeople from Zhangzhou
21st-century Chinese women